Jamel M. White (born February 11, 1978) is a former professional American football running back who also played for the Canadian Football League Toronto Argonauts.  White is a former NFL player for the Cleveland Browns and appeared in games for the Tampa Bay Buccaneers and Baltimore Ravens.  White scored eleven touchdowns in his NFL career. He currently coaches high school track at Riverside high school in Painesville Ohio.

On January 26, 2007, White signed with the Toronto Argonauts of the CFL.  He was announced as the starter for the home opener on June 25, 2007 over incumbent John Avery. After appearing in three games, White was released by the Argonauts on August 19, 2007.

Played three seasons with the Cleveland Browns. Started in several different positions such as running back, Wide Receiver, and the kick and punt returner.

References

External links
ESPN.com stats

Toronto Argonauts profile

1978 births
American football running backs
South Dakota Coyotes football players
Baltimore Ravens players
Cleveland Browns players
Living people
Players of American football from Los Angeles
Tampa Bay Buccaneers players
Toronto Argonauts players
Canadian football running backs
American players of Canadian football
Players of Canadian football from Los Angeles